Luk Keng Chan Uk is a village situated in the Luk Keng area, in the northeastern part of the New Territories, Hong Kong. It is a popular tourist destination for sightseeing and hiking.

Administration
Luk Keng Chan Uk is a recognized village under the New Territories Small House Policy. It is one of the villages represented within the Sha Tau Kok District Rural Committee. For electoral purposes, Luk Keng Chan Uk is part of the Sha Ta constituency, which is currently represented by Ko Wai-kei.

History
The village is mainly inhabited by the Chan ( Hakka tshin11 ) Clan although there are other surnames present in the village including Wong. It is a Hakka-speaking village. Historically, the village was used for livestock farming and growing crops. Today, the village is mostly uninhabited, and half of the village houses are deserted.

The Chan clan's ancestor came to Luk Keng from the Ta Kwu Leng area in the 1700s, with other descendants travelling to Tsuen Wan. Those that came to Luk Keng erected the water barrier upon which the main road now travels upon, separating the village's agricultural land from the seawater.

In the 1950s and 1960s, many villagers left for the UK and other parts of the world. This was partly due to UK immigration policy at the time and with little work available in the village the inhabitants sought to earn money elsewhere.

Little development has taken place in Luk Keng, mainly because the government has zoned the wetland as an area of Special Scientific Interest. Moreover, the Government's planning policy has also restricted development of small houses and unilaterally designated parts of the area as conservation area, although most of it is private land.

Built heritage
There are two ancestral halls at Luk Keng Chan Uk, the Chan Ancestral Hall, built around 1900, and the Chan Tze Tak Ancestral Hall.

The ruins of the village school, Man Lam School, can still be seen. The school was closed in 1952 and replaced by Luk Keng Public School.

Flora and fauna
Luk Keng is known for its natural scenery and wildlife, which is in contrast to Hong Kong's urbanized culture. Parts of Luk Keng are surrounded by tropical rainforests. Rare animals such as the scarlet dwarf dragonfly and black-faced spoonbill have been sighted in Luk Keng, as well as monkeys. Waterfalls are present in Luk Keng.

Transportation
The closest station to Luk Keng on the MTR is Fanling station. Green minibus No.56K runs to the Luk Keng terminus.

See also
 List of villages in Hong Kong

References

Further reading

External links
 Delineation of area of existing village Luk Keng Chan Uk (Sha Tau Kok) for election of resident representative (2019 to 2022)
 Antiquities Advisory Board. Historic Building Appraisal. Chan Ancestral Hall, No. 104 Luk Keng Chan Uk Pictures
 Pictures of Luk Keng Chan Uk
 The Luk Keng Original People (archive)

Villages in North District, Hong Kong
Sha Tau Kok